Mohamed Camara (born 27 October 1987) is a Malian footballer who plays as a defender for Real Bamako and the Mali national team.

International career
Camara made his professional debut with the Mali national team in a 3–1 friendly win over China on 29 June 2014.

References

External links
 
 

1987 births
Living people
Sportspeople from Bamako
Malian footballers
Mali international footballers
Association football defenders
AS Onze Créateurs de Niaréla players
Malian Première Division players
21st-century Malian people
Mali A' international footballers
2020 African Nations Championship players
AS Real Bamako players